Reza Naji (June 27, 1923 - 15 February 1979) as Iranian general and Military Governor of Isfahan during 1979 Islamic Revolution.

After the 1979 Revolution, he was arrested, tried, and sentenced to death by the Revolutionary Court, Sadegh Khalkhali. His sentence and that of three other army commanders was carried out on February 15, 1979, on the roof of the Refah School located on Ain al-Dawla Street (Iran).

His body was buried in Behesht Zahra.

Immediately after his revolutionary execution and that of other officials of the former regime, young people stationed around the Revolutionary Committee and in the streets of Iran and Jaleh began firing from the air, expressing their joy at the incident. The news of the group's execution reached the residents of the streets around the Revolutionary Committee through a loudspeaker.

References 

Imperial Iranian Army major generals
1923 births
1979 deaths